Iron County Airport (FAA LID: 50D) is a public-use airport located 6 miles southeast of Crystal Falls, MI. It is located in and owned by Iron County. It is open from April to December.

Facilities and aircraft 
The airport has two runways. Runway 12/30 measures 3690 x 50 ft (1125 x 15 m) and is paved with asphalt, while runway 2/20 is 2700 x 145 ft (823 x 44 m) and is turf.

The airport does not have a fixed-base operator, and no fuel is available.

For the 12-month period ending ending December 31, 2019, the airport has 150 aircraft operations per year, an average of 13 per month. It is all general aviation. For the same time period, 3 aircraft are based on the airport, all single-engine airplanes.

Accidents and incidents 

 On October 17, 2009, Gottelt Herbert R Kitfox IV was substantially damaged during a hard landing at Iron County Airport. The pilot stated that immediately after liftoff he was unable to move the control stick to the left of the center (neutral) position, although he was able to move the control stick to the right, forward, and aft without restriction. The pilot returned for landing; however, “at about 30 [feet] altitude the aircraft began to stall.” The airplane subsequently landed hard, separating the main landing gear. Both wings and the fuselage structure were substantially damaged during the event. The probable cause was found to be the pilot's inability to maintain control due to an undetermined problem affecting lateral control of the airplane.
 On May 16, 2012, a Cessna A185F ran off the runway and ground looped after two deer ran onto the runway.
 On June 2, 2017, a Piper PA18 overran the runway after landing at Iron County Airport.

References 

Airports in Michigan
Aviation in Michigan
Transportation in Iron County, Michigan
Buildings and structures in Iron County, Michigan